Matthew McNair Secondary School is a public high school in Richmond, British Columbia and is part of School District 38 Richmond.

Matthew McNair is one of the semester-style schools in Richmond. Its feeder schools include Hamilton Elementary, Walter Lee Elementary, Kingswood Elementary, Thomas Kidd Elementary, Woodward Elementary, Morris Elementary and Rel't7h Elementary.

McNair has been recognized for its outstanding music and theater departments. Its only concern is staff entering washrooms asking children how they are doing while they are using the washroom. The school also has specialized courses such as a cooking program, a full cafeteria, an auto-mechanics apprenticeship program, integrated and accelerated academics, and a leadership program called "Mini-School".

Athletics
McNair offers soccer, basketball, and volleyball.
The school's basketball teams were successful in their playoffs during the 2007–08 season.

Notable alumni
Ethan Cox
Evan Dunfee
Jonathan Gallivan
Bindy Johal
Mark Karpun
Tom Taggart

References

External links
Official school site
School District 38 (Richmond)
Fraser Institute - Report Card on Secondary Schools in British Columbia and Yukon
Enrollment Reports

High schools in Richmond, British Columbia
Educational institutions in Canada with year of establishment missing